Westoll is a surname. Notable people include:

Andrew Westoll, Canadian writer
Thomas Stanley Westoll (1912–1995), British geologist
Tim Westoll (1918–1999), English barrister, country landowner, and politician

See also
Westall (disambiguation)